This is a list of partially guyed towers.

See also
List of additionally guyed towers

References

Partially guyed
Guyed masts
Towers, partially guyed